Get the Fuck Up Radio (GTFU) was an internet and pirate radio radio program located in Los Angeles.  The program was broadcast every Monday night from 2000 to 2010 by Aaron Farley and Jeremy Weiss as an excuse for two friends to get together and drink beer and play music and showcase their friends' bands. A few years later, Annie Hardy was added to the team. Other regulars to the show include Luis the Humble Mexican, Chrississippi, Curtis Mead, Kevin Kusatsu, Devin Foley, Jentern and Travis Keller.  

The show originally aired on internet station Kill Radio. Then the show aired from 8:00-11:00pm PST every Monday night on Little Radio. The last couple of years of the show were broadcast out of a secret location in Silver Lake on Monday nights at 7-10PM on GTFURadio.com.  

GTFU Radio has been featured in LA Weekly, LA Record and Swindle Magazine. Some past guests of GTFU include Say Anything, Franz Ferdinand, Saves the Day, Giant Drag, The Libertines,  Piebald, Mars Volta, Matt Costa, Rilo Kiley and former Guns N' Roses guitarist Slash.  GTFU also hosted the first live performances of Los Angeles' Warpaint.

Footnotes

External links
GTFU Radio official website
Matt Costa live on GTFU

Internet radio in the United States